Uku is an Estonian masculine given name.

People named Uku include:

Uku Hänni (born 1943), civil servant
Uku Masing (1909–1985), philosopher, translator, theologist and folklorist
Uku Suviste (born 1982), singer

Estonian masculine given names